Horizon High School is a public secondary institution located in Thornton, Colorado.

History 
Horizon High School opened in 1988 to relieve crowding at Northglenn High School.

Following rapid growth in Adams County throughout the 1990s, Horizon High School quickly filled to capacity and by 1999 the campus had 20 portable classrooms outside the school's main building.

Originally, the school only had grades 10-12. The graduating class of 1998 was the first freshman class to attend the school.

Horizon's goals are simple: to provide learning programs for each individual student that fits his/her needs; to emphasize academic courses that challenge each student to grow intellectually; to teach students to think critically, master basic skills, develop healthful lifestyles and become active citizens; and finally, to install Horizon PRIDE in each and every student.

Athletics 
Horizon High School fields teams that compete in interscholastic competition in baseball, basketball, cross-country, football, golf, gymnastics, soccer, softball, swimming, diving, tennis, track and field, volleyball and wrestling.

State championship titles:
 Boys' basketball: 1998 (5A)
 Girls' basketball: 1993 (6A)
 Boys' soccer: 1991 (6A), 1992 (6A), 2000 (5A)

Notable alumni 
 Jamie Carey, 1999, WNBA player
 John Denney, long snapper for the Miami Dolphins
 Ryan Denney, 1995, defensive end for the Buffalo Bills
 Matthew Ryan Hoge, 1992, director, The United States of Leland
 Jeremy McKinney, 1994, offensive lineman for the St Louis Rams, Cleveland Browns, Dallas Cowboys, picked in the 11th round of the expansion draft by the Houston Texans
 Kevin Priola, Colorado State Senate, District 25(R)

See also 
 Adams County School District 12
 List of high schools in Colorado

References

External links 
 

Education in Thornton, Colorado
Educational institutions established in 1988
Public high schools in Colorado
Schools in Adams County, Colorado
1988 establishments in Colorado